George Alexandru Cîmpanu (born 8 October 2000) is a Romanian professional footballer who plays as an attacking midfielder or a forward for Liga I club Universitatea Craiova.

Club career
Cîmpanu played youth football for Concordia Chiajna and German team Memmingen, before moving to Alexandria in 2018 to register his debut as a senior in the Romanian third division.

The following year, Cîmpanu joined Botoșani and amassed three goals from 20 appearances in the Liga I. His good display prompted a €500,000 transfer to fellow league team Universitatea Craiova on 5 October 2020, shortly before his 20th birthday.

Career statistics

Club

Honours
Universitatea Craiova
Cupa României: 2020–21
Supercupa României: 2021

References

External links

George Cîmpanu at Liga Profesionistă de Fotbal 

2000 births
Living people
People from Ilfov County
Romanian footballers
Association football midfielders
Association football forwards
CS Concordia Chiajna players
FC Memmingen players
Liga I players
Liga III players
FC Botoșani players
CS Universitatea Craiova players
Romania under-21 international footballers
Romanian expatriate footballers
Expatriate footballers in Germany
Romanian expatriate sportspeople in Germany